The Men's 5 km competition of the 2018 European Aquatics Championships was held on 8 August 2018.

Results
The race was started at 11:10.

References

Men's 5 km